Meno Burg (9 October 1789 – 26 August 1853), also referred to as Judenmajor (Jew major), was a Prussian field officer. Burg reached the highest rank ever attained by a Jew in the Prussian Army of the 19th century. However, his military career is also an example of the discrimination which was suffered by Jews who served the Prussian government.

Education and civilian career 

Meno Burg was born into a Jewish family of poor circumstances in Berlin, Margraviate of Brandenburg. He left the school in 1804 to become an apprentice to his cousin Salomo Sachs, a royal building inspector. He visited the Berlin Building Academy, where he finished in 1807 the exam as field-surveyor. Like his cousin who was the first Jew who had entered the Prussian civil service under Frederick William II, Burg became a civil servant under Frederick William III. In doing so, Burg had entered into a field which was outside of the professions Jews were allowed to enter in Prussia according to the prevailing regulations of the 'Revised General Concession and Regulation' dated 17 April 1750. It appears that due to the political circumstances, the regulations governing the Jews in Prussia were not strictly followed. According to the legal situation at the time, Burg could have been denied to enter his chosen profession. Burg was already a government employee, when the new Prussian civil rights legislation for Jews was enacted on 11 March 1812. This law naturalised Jewish inhabitants of Prussia as Prussian citizens, a franchise established in 1810 when doing away with the prior estates (nobility, serfs, burghers, Huguenots, etc.), but the admission to government positions was not called for and was reserved for future legislation.

Enlistment in the Prussian Army during the War of Liberation 

Burg was awaiting his final exam at the Prussian Academy of Arts in Berlin, when he volunteered on 14 February 1813 for the military service to fight for 'Prussia's freedom and rebirth', as he put it. The troop of his choice was the Guard Infantry Battalion in Breslau, an elite unit of the infantry. After only a few days, he was discharged from this unit on the grounds that Jews were "under the existing laws and the prevailing circumstances" not allowed to serve in the Guard. The rejection of Jewish soldiers in the Guard appears to have been a matter of course for the established circles. State Chancellor Karl August von Hardenberg, usually a supporter of equal rights for the Jews, left Burg's two requests for re-enlistment in the Guard unanswered. Hereupon, Burg decided to apply for the artillery, a branch of the service which was considered less prestigious by the Prussian nobility and more suitable for the middle-classes. To avoid risking another discharge, Burg applied to the service chief of the artillery, Prince August of Prussia, who secured for him an admission. Since Burg's accomplishments were widely recognized, the lieutenants of his unit recommended him after just nine months of service to become an officer. However, the promotion was vetoed by the base commander (German: Platzkommandant) Captain Karl Moritz Ferdinand von Bardeleben, stating that "as long as (he) had something to say, no Jew shall be officer in the artillery". Consequently officer cadets, who had been trained by Burg, were promoted before him. Even his transfer to a combat unit did not help him to get promoted earlier. Only a mention of bravery could have accelerated his promotion, but his unit was not deployed to the front.

Burg was not the first Prussian officer of Jewish faith. Other Prussian Jews had already become officers at the beginning of the war. They were soldiers in combat units who had been promoted during combat, or they belonged to the militia, the Free Corps or the Landwehr (National Guard). Burg became finally second lieutenant on 18 August 1815 and was transferred to the First Artillery Brigade (East Prussia) in Danzig as a company officer.

Officer during the Restoration 

Since 1816 as an instructor at the United Artillery and Engineer School in Berlin, Burg's principal subject of instruction was drawing and geometry, on which science he wrote a text-book that attained great popularity, being frequently republished and translated into several languages. On 4 July 1826, Burg was promoted to first lieutenant, on time and according to his seniority. It is noteworthy that Burg received his promotion, while other Jewish volunteers, who claimed their legitimate rights to employment in the civil service, had been rejected because of their faith.

Despite the highest protection by August Prince of Prussia, Burg nearly had not been promoted to the rank of a captain. In this promotion drama, Burg initially had to compromise to be promoted to the rank of a "captain of the army" only, a rank that was not equivalent to a captain of the artillery. Then he was invited to be baptized, to make the promotion possible, what Burg ultimately rejected. Burg requested the baptism once in 1824, but then he postponed his request "because of family relationships" on 16 November 1824.

On 6 December 1830 Burg had to learn, that the King did not even want to appoint him to the rank of a captain of the army, because he had not attained "the salvation of the Christian faith". Burg's accomplishments in the service and the fact that he was a well-known book author and a respected military educator were not taken into consideration. Since it simply came down to discrimination based on his belief, Burg considered quitting the army. Completely unforeseen, he was finally promoted to the rank of a captain of the artillery, on time and according to his seniority. He could not, however, wear the uniform of the artillery, but only the uniform of an armory captain, a special branch in the Prussian army that ranked at the bottom.

Officer in the Pre-March Era 

In the Pre-March Era it needed a new chief of the artillery, Prince Adalbert of Prussia, and a new king Frederick William IV to remove the injustice of the discriminatory  (German for: "corps [or troop-function] color"). Through a cabinet order of 16 April 1844, Burg was allowed to replace the black epaulettes of the armory with the red epaulettes of the artillery.

That was not the end of the discrimination. As the rank and quarter lists of the Prussian Army show, Burg was passed over by others who had entered the service after him. On 27 March 1847, Burg was granted the "character of a Major in the artillery". That was actually not a real promotion. His uniform showed to the outside that he was a major, but in reality he did not serve on an established post of a major. He did not receive the salary of a major and he was not "in line" for another promotion. That was the end of his military career. The grounds given, that Burg's post would have exceeded the budget for a field officer is not convincing. There were always two to three younger majors on fully paid positions at the school, younger officers without Burg's merits. The political circumstances did not allow Jews to enter into the Prussian government positions or to get promoted if they had already a government position. He said that he would "give the Jews all rights, but not to hold positions of authority in a Christian State"; if he had to obey a Jew, he would feel "deeply depressed and knuckled down".

Burg had to endure similar experiences when it came to the award of military medals. Although he had been recommended since 1838 by the commander of the United Artillery and Engineer School for the Order of the Red Eagle Class IV, it took more than three years until the medal was finally awarded to him by king Frederick William IV. The value of the medal can be explained with the fact that in the Artillery Brigade, which Burg belonged to until his promotion to captain, had been – at the moment of the award of the medal to Burg – under eighteen captains only one who had the medal and among the eight captains at his school, where he worked as an instructor, Burg was the only one.< It appears that the Prussian kings did not hesitate as much when it came to awarding civilian medals to Jews. Burg repeatedly received high civilian awards.

Devout Jew 

Burg was a devout Jew and participated actively in the Jewish community life. He was active on various committees in the Jewish congregation of Berlin and served for one year (1849–1850) as one of the elders on the board of the congregation. Burg resigned, when the board lost its legitimacy because it failed to comply with the General Concession for the Jews dated 17 April 1750 and when the board decided to file a complaint with the court. As a royal officer, Burg did not want to share "the insubordination against the government".

Burg tried to strictly separate between his government service and his religion. This proved to be nearly impossible, because both his government, which described itself as "Christian", as well as his congregation, who considered itself "orthodox", did not adhere to a strict separation between church and state. As a soldier, Burg was not able to strictly follow the Jewish ceremonial laws. That means that he had to disengage himself from a strict orthodoxy. In this respect, he is an example for a neo-orthodox, who felt that government service does not preclude the ceremonial law.

Loyal monarchist Prussian 

Burg described himself in his memoirs as a Prussian loyal to the crown and devoted to the king. Religiously he was rooted in Judaism. One did not exclude the other. He shared his political views and his patriotism with many in the educated German Jewish community, with whom he socially interacted, who wanted to assimilate into German society and who felt increasingly accepted.

During the years 1847 to 1849 Burg was engaged in writing his autobiography, which was published in 1854 in Berlin under the title  ("history of my life in service").

In the March Revolution of 1848, Wolfgang Straßmann and eight further revolutionaries sought refuge in Burg's house at Berlin's Poststrasse when their barricades were attacked by Prussian troops on 18 March 1848. Except of Straßmann, who hid in the bed of one of Burg's servant girls, all of them were executed on the spot.

On 26 August 1853, Burg died as one of the first victims of the cholera epidemic. The funeral, which was conducted on 29 August with military honors, was a big event for the city of Berlin. The police estimated that about 60,000 people had gathered.

Publications

Notes

References

Bibliography

External links 
 Jewish Encyclopedia, article about Meno Burg
 Major Meno Burg: A Prussian officer of Jewish faith(17891–853) by Renatus F. Rieger, Dissertation (in German), available at Olms
 Judentum, Staat und Heer in Preußen im frühen 19. Jahrhundert by Horst Fischer probably the leading work about Jews in the Prussian government (in German)
 Jews in Berlin by Andreas Nachama, Julius Hans Schoeps, Hermann Simon
 Die Judenbürgerbücher der Stadt Berlin, 1809–1851 by Jacob Jacobson probably the leading work for Berlin Jewish genealogy (in German)
 The Invisible Wall: Germans and Jews: a Personal Exploration by W. Michael Blumenthal
 Catholics and Jews in Germany, 1800–1914 by Helmut Walser Smith
 The Pity of It All: A Portrait of the German-Jewish Epoch, 1743–1933 by Amos Elon
 Hitler's Jewish Soldiers: The Untold Story of Nazi Racial Laws and Men of Jewish Descent in the German Military, by Bryan Mark Rigg
 Tensions and Convergences: Technological and Aesthetic Transformations of Society by Reinhard Heil
 German-Jewish History in Modern Times: Emancipation and Acculturation, 1870–1871 by Michael Brenner et al., the author incorrectly claims that Burg was the only Jewish officer in the Prussian army
 The limits of the confessional state: conversions to Judaism in Prussia 1814–1843 by Christopher Clark
 Lexikon des Judentums by Julius H. Schoeps

1789 births
1853 deaths
Military personnel from Berlin
German Jewish military personnel
Prussian Army personnel
People from the Margraviate of Brandenburg